Das Qaleh (also Romanized as Dās Qal‘eh) is a village in Kuhin Rural District, in the Central District of Kabudarahang County, Hamadan Province, Iran. At the 2006 census, its population was 1,349, in 270 families.

References 

Populated places in Kabudarahang County